What More Can I Ask? is a popular song written in 1932 with lyrics by A. E. Wilkins and music by Ray Noble.

Recordings

References 

1932 songs
Songs written by Ray Noble
Al Bowlly songs